The Hassanzai is a sub-clan of Yousafzai, which is a Pakhtoon/Pashtoon/Pathan tribe. It is one of the divisions of the Isazai clan of the Yousafzai tribe. Yousafzai tribe is regarded as one of the most powerful, famous, and respected tribes of Pashtoons. Colonel H. C. Wylly (1858–1932) described these people in the following words:

Origin
The Hassanzais are amongst The Black Mountain (Tor Ghar) Tribes; a division of the Isazai clan of the Yousafzai tribe. They are the descendants of Hassan the son of Isa (Isazai) and the grandson of Yusaf/Yousaf/(Yousafzai). The Hassanzais are further divided into following ten Sections:

The Sections

Demographics
The Hassanzais live on either side of the Indus; those cis-Indus occupy the most southern portion of the western slopes of Tor Ghar, while those trans-Indus live immediately opposite to them. The Hassanzai area is bounded on the north and east by the Akazais, on the west by the Indus, and on the south the Hassanzai border adjoins the territory of Tanawal, the former state of Amb.

Culture and traditions
Like all other Pashtoons, Hassanzais have maintained their cultural identity and individuality. They lead their lives strictly in accordance with code of ethics of Pashtunwali which comprises Manliness, Goodness, Gallantery, Loyalty and Modesty. Hassanzais have also maintained the Pashtoon customs of Jirga (Consultative Assembly), Nanawati (Delegation pleading guilty), Hujhra (Large drawing room) and Melmasteya (Hospitality).

Fighting against the British 
The Black Mountain (Tor Ghar) Tribes had never been under the British Rule. Hassanzais along with Akazais had been actively involved in fighting with British for quite some time. Brief account of the British Expeditions against The Black Mountain (Tor Ghar) Tribes is as under:-

Under Lieutenant Colonel F. Mackeson, in 1852–53, against the Hassanzais. The occasion was the murder of two British customs officers. A force of 3800 British troops traversed their country, destroying their villages, grain and crops.
Under Major-General A. T. Wilde, in 1868. The occasion was an attack on a British police post at Oghi in the Agror Valley by all The Black Mountain (Tor Ghar) Tribes. A force of 12,500 British troops entered the country and the tribes made peace.
The First Hazara Expedition in 1888. The cause was the constant raids made by the tribes on villages in British territory, culminating in an attack on a small British reconnaissance troop, in which two British officers were killed. A force of 9,500 British troops traversed the country of the tribes, and severe fighting took place.
The Second Hazara Expedition of 1891. The Black Mountain (Tor Ghar) Tribes fired on a force within British limits. A force of 7300 British troops traversed the country. The tribesmen made their peace and entered into an agreement with government to preserve the peace of the border.

Recent developments

On 28 January 2011, Tor Ghar became the 25th district of Khyber Pakhtoonkhwa. Judba is the Capital of this newly born district with multiple tehsils:-
 Judba
 Kandar Hassanzai
 Mada Khel

Most of the Hassanzai areas come under the Kandar tehsil.

References 

Social groups of Pakistan
Yusufzai Pashtun tribes